The following is an episode guide for the Canadian teen dramedy Radio Free Roscoe. This episode guide is divided into 4 seasons of 13 episodes each, as the series was aired on The N in America. In Canada, the series was originally aired as two seasons of 26 episodes each.

Episode guide
This guide is listed by production number. The original airdates are not completely from one channel, but they are the premiere airdates internationally.

The first two episodes were never intended to air on TV because they were filmed as the series pilots. On Family, the episodes were premiered after episode 112.

Season 1

Season 2

Season 3

Season 4

The N episode airings
Several episodes were aired out of order on The N. In their Season 2, a few episodes were aired out of production order, so that "How to Lose a Girl" could be seen as a two parter, even though the episodes were originally divided. Below is a table showing the order change.

For the series finale, The N compiled the episodes "Dancing Around the Truth" (225) and "The Last Dance" (226) into an hour-long season finale, simply titled "Dance Around the Truth".

Radio Free Roscoe
Radio Free Roscoe